Didi Chuxing Technology Co. (stylized DiDi, pronounced [tɨ́tɨ́ ʈʂʰúɕɪ̌ŋ]), formerly named Didi Dache and Didi Kuaidi, is a Chinese vehicle for hire company headquartered in Beijing with over 550 million users and tens of millions of drivers. The company provides app-based transportation services, including taxi hailing, private car hailing, social ride-sharing, and bike sharing; on-demand delivery services; and automobile services, including sales, leasing, financing, maintenance, fleet operation, electric vehicle charging, and co-development of vehicles with automakers. The company is a subsidiary of Xiaoju Kuaizhi Inc.

History

2012–2014: founding of Didi Dache
"滴滴" means "beep beep" in Mandarin (like a car's horn). So 滴滴打车 literally means "Beep-beep! Mobility".

The application was the initial incarnation of Didi Chuxing's ride-hailing service, and consisted of an app for consumers to request taxis and other rideshare services for immediate pick up. BeiJing XiaoJu Keji Co. developed the app. In November 2012, Tencent invested $15 million in the company.

2015: merger of Didi Dache and Kuaidi Dache 
A study in December 2013 by Analysis International, estimated that at the time Didi Dache (backed by Chinese Internet giant Tencent Holdings Limited) held approximately 55% of the smartphone-based taxi-hailing market in China (about 150 million Chinese were estimated to use their smartphones to hail taxis). According to the same study, Kuaidi Dache (快的打车; meaning "Fast Taxi"), backed by Alibaba Group, held most of the remaining market share. Aggressive fundraising by the two companies resulted in Didi Dache and Kuaidi Dache raising US$700 million and US$600 million from private investors, respectively, to sustain their growth in the world's largest transport market. In February 2015 the companies merged to form Didi Kuaidi.

In May 2015, Didi Kuaidi spent aggressively to compete with other startups including Yidao Yongche and Uber (of which Baidu was an investor). The company also added other features to complement its basic taxi-calling function such as new premium vehicle services, functions for carpool and designated driver transportation modes and enhanced accessibility functions for passengers with disabilities. In July 2015, Didi Kuaidi completed a US$2 billion fundraising round, bringing the company's cash reserves to over US$3.5 billion; the same month, Didi Kuaidi was reported to get 80.2% market share in car hire services. Didi Kuaidi's existing stakeholders, including Alibaba, Tencent, Temasek Holdings (Private) Ltd and Coatue Management, participated in the round, alongside new investors including, Capital International Private Equity Fund and Ping An Ventures, part of Ping An Insurance Group Co of China Ltd. The July 2015 fundraise is ranked as the world's largest single fundraising round by any private company, as well as the largest fundraising round for a Chinese mobile internet company at that time.

By September 2015, Didi Kuaidi had obtained 80% market share in private car hailing services and 99% of the taxis market share. The same month, Didi Kuaidi announced the launch of a rebrand process, including a plan to rename itself "Didi Chuxing". Following the rebrand, in December 2015, taxi drivers concerned with the potential risk of ride-hailing applications cutting into their business protested against Didi Dache and Kuaidi Dache, forcing both companies to close their offices in the city of Luoyang.

2016: acquisition of Uber China
By the beginning of 2016, Uber China, which started its Chinese operations in 2015, had become a major competitor to Didi Kuaidi. Uber's then-CEO, Travis Kalanick, claimed the company was losing over US$1 billion annually in China. 

DiDi closed a US$4.5 billion fundraising round in June 2016, with investors including Apple Inc., China Life Insurance Co., and a financial affiliate of Alibaba Group Holding Ltd. As part of the round, DiDi secured a $2.5 billion syndicated loan arranged by China Merchants Bank Co. This equity share fundraising round is one of the world's largest by any private company, surpassing the previous record set by DiDi.

On 1 August 2016, DiDi announced that it would acquire Uber China in an acquisition valuing Uber China at US$35 billion. As part of the deal, Uber acquired 5.89% of the combined Chinese company with preferred equity interest which at the time equated to a 17.7% economic interest in DiDi. The transaction also provided DiDi with a minority equity interest in Uber.

In April 2019, Uber released a public version of its S-1 filing ahead of its planned initial public offering. As part of the filing, Uber revealed that at the time of filing, the company owned a 15.4% stake in DiDi. Uber's stake in the company was diluted (from 17.7% in 2016 to the 2019 stake) as a result of new investments from additional investors since 2016.

2017–2020: business expansion, crisis and safety system enhancement 
In March 2017, The Wall Street Journal reported that SoftBank Group Corporation approached DiDi with an offer to invest $6 billion in the company to fund the ride-hailing firm's expansion in self-driving car technologies, with a significant portion of the money to come from SoftBank's then-planned $100 billion Vision Fund.

On 28 April 2017, DiDi announced it closed a new financing round of over US$5.5 billion to support its global expansion strategy and continued investments in AI-based technologies. The round valued the company at US$50 billion.

In December 2017, Reuters reported that DiDi had raised $4 billion for a global push into foreign markets and investments into technologies such as Artificial Intelligence.

In May 2018 the company received a wave of negative media coverage when a female passenger on the company's Hitch social carpooling service was murdered by her driver. In August of the same year, a second female passenger was raped and killed by her driver using the same Hitch service on the DiDi platform. Following these incidents, DiDi suspended its Hitch services in August 2018, and began to reform its platform with improved safety standards. In September 2018, Didi announced an investment of $20 million in customer service, The app's safety updates included an evolving set of safety precautions and in-app functions, including the formation of an in-app safety center, en-route audio recording, police assistance button and blocking function to restrict service from certain drivers and passengers. The company also invested $20 million in its customer service offerings and increased its in-house customer service team to 8,000 staff.[63] As part of the update, DiDi created an online discussion platform to facilitate online and offline national public opinion surveys in China. Media reported that in 2018, DiDi recorded losses of up to $1.61 billion owing to heavy spend on training and recruitment of qualified and skilled drivers.

In 2018, the company launched its "Red Flag Steering Wheel" program in which verified Chinese Communist Party (CCP) members would be visible as drivers. The company also pledged to hire 1,000 CCP members as part of its safety drive.

In 2018, the company launched a bike and e-bike sharing platform and expanded vertically into auto service sector with the spinoff of Xiaoju Automobile Solutions, a platform providing auto sales, leasing, financing, car maintenance, refueling and recharging services to driver partners on the platform and independent vehicle owners.

Since 2015, DiDi has invested in Grab, Lyft, Ola, Uber, 99, Bolt (Taxify) and Careem, and expanded into Latin America, Australia and Japan. In January 2018, DiDi acquired 99, a Brazilian ride hailing app.

Since late 2020, DiDi cooperates with BYD and developed the BYD D1 for ride-hailing services.

Following the launch of the BYD D1, in April 2021, DiDi officially started its own car-building plan, code-named “Da Vinci”. The headquarters of the car building team is located in Shunyi District, Beijing and has recruited 1,700 employees, covering R&D, senior algorithm engineer, autonomous driving development team and so on.

2021–present: initial public offering and regulatory scrutiny 
On 10 June 2021, DiDi filed to go public on the New York Stock Exchange hoping to raise $10 billion, making it the second largest Chinese share offering in the US since Alibaba. On 16 June, it was reported that the State Administration for Market Regulation (SAMR) launched an investigation into DiDi around pricing and competitive practices. On 30 June the company went public on the NYSE under the stock ticker "DIDI", raising $4.4 billion on a valuation of close to $70 billion US dollars.

However, on July 4th, 2021, the Cyberspace Administration of China ordered app stores to remove DiDi, citing violations around the company's collection and usage of personal information. Chinese authorities ordered all app stores in China to remove 25 apps owned and operated by DiDi, including Didi Chuxing Enterprise Edition, Uber China, and D-Chat. Chinese regulators also fined DiDi, along with other Chinese tech firms such as Alibaba and Tencent, for alleged violations of the country's Anti-Monopoly Law. The fines were for 500,000 yuan ($77,174)—the maximum amount for such violations.

Due to the uncertainty surrounding DiDi and other Chinese companies listed in the US, the U.S. Securities and Exchange Commission temporarily halted all IPOs from Chinese companies in August of 2021.  DiDi also revealed that it was under investigation by the SEC in regards to its IPO.

In December 2021, DiDi announced that it planned to delist from New York and re-list on the Hong Kong Stock Exchange. However, DiDi's plans to re-list on the Hong King Stock Exchange were halted in March of 2022 after the Cyberspace Administration of China informed DiDi executives that they still failed to meet security regulations, and DiDi's shares fell 44% as a result.

DiDi formally de-listed from the NYSE on June 13th, 2022 and began trading over-the-counter under the symbol "DIDIY". DiDi was fined 8.026 billion yuan ($1.2 billion USD) by the Cyberspace Administration of China in July for allegedly breaking its cyber security laws. DiDi CEO, Cheng Wei, and DiDi President, Jean Liu, were also fined $150,000 each for the violations.

DiDi finally won approval to restart new user registration in China in January of 2023, a week ahead of the Lunar New Year, in a move seen as a softening of China's crackdown on its tech companies.

Services
DiDi serves 550 million users across over 400 cities with products including Taxi, Express, Premier, Luxe, Bus, Designated Driving, Enterprise Solutions, Bike Sharing, E-bike Sharing, Car Rental and sharing, and food delivery. A total of 7.43 billion rides were completed on DiDi's platform in 2017. Some of DiDi's services include:

DiDi Taxi: Launched in September 2012, the service provides intelligent request-dispatching system for taxi companies to enhance driver efficiency and user experience. DiDi currently partners with more than 500 taxi companies in China, Japan and Brazil.

DiDi Express: Launched in May 2015, the service matches riders traveling in the same direction with an available shared car. DiDi ExpressPool carries over 2.4 million daily rides in 2018.

DiDi Premier: Launched in April 2014 and rebranded in 2018, the service includes a 24/7 customer service hotline in Chinese and English and special services, including premier vehicles equipped with child seats, adapted vehicles for riders with disabilities, and special arrangements for guide dogs.

Designated Driving: Launched in July 2015, the service lets customers who own a vehicle request a chauffeur to drive them. In 2015, the service operated in about 200 cities.

Enterprise Solution: The service offers business travel services to about 170,000 corporate clients.

DiDi Bus: Launched initially in Beijing and Shenzhen in 2015, the platform offers a wide range of products and systems, including a real-time minibus pooling service (U+ Bus), customized bus services (Youdian Bus), data-based intelligent bus dispatching service and real-time bus service inquiry service. In 2018, DiDi launched an intermodal transportation recommendation function allowing users to search and book public transportation, online car-hailing and bike-sharing services in a single smartphone screen.

DiDi Luxe: Launched in May 2017, the service offers professional chauffeurs and mid-to-high end premium luxury cars.

Bike-Sharing: In April 2017, DiDi added bike-sharing services to its app. On 17 January 2018, DiDi launched its own bike-sharing platform, which integrates companies like Ofo, Bluegogo and DiDi-branded bikes and e-bikes.

Xiaoju Automobile Solutions: Incubated in 2015 and put in trial operation in April 2018, Xiaoju provides various auto-related services, including leasing and trading, refueling and recharging, maintenance, repair and car-sharing services to DiDi drivers and independent car owners. In August 2018, DiDi announced a $1 billion investment into the platform. In January 2019, a Xiaoju Automobile Solutions app was launched.

DiDi Financial Services: In January 2019, DiDi announced the launch of a new line of financial services, such as car insurance, personal loans and crowdfunded medical insurance, available through a separate "DiDi Finance" app.

DiDi Food: Launched in April 2018, DiDi Foodie is DiDi's food delivery service, available in Mexico, Brazil and China.

DiDi English: In May 2017, DiDi released an English-language service in the Chinese mainland. The service offers English-language user interface and a real-time, in-app, instant text message translation to facilitate rider-driver communication.

Technology 
Artificial Intelligence (AI): The DiDi Research Institute is focused on AI technologies including machine learning and computer vision to optimize the platform's dispatch system and route planning services. A few hundred scientists work on deep-learning technologies at the institute. To expand on this research, DiDi launched AI Labs in Beijing and in 2018 the company opened DiDi Labs in Mountain View, California. This facility mainly focuses on AI-based security and intelligent driving technologies.

Big data operation: DiDi is building a cloud platform to integrate anonymized data from sensors on vehicles, static information and real-time events from roads with anonymized platform data including pick-up and drop-off, trips and carrying capacity information. This data allows platform supply and demand to be balanced efficiently, and enables mitigation tactics for traffic congestion.

Smart transportation: The DiDi Smart Transportation Brain is powered by AI and cloud technology. The program's goal is to develop smart traffic lights and optimize traffic management systems that can be applied in cities facing road congestion. For instance, in April 2018, DiDi and the Beijing Capital International Airport Public Security Bureau Traffic Detachment jointly built a smart transportation innovation laboratory to promote smart airport traffic solutions including smart traffic lights, traffic information services and car-hailing management innovations. Since 2018, the traffic lights at more than 30 intersections in the airport area have been optimized, and the delays in the airport area at night peaks have been reduced by about 20%. As of 2019, DiDi Smart Transportation projects have been deployed in more than 20 cities, including Jinan, Guiyang, Tianjin, and Shenzhen. These projects include traffic management systems, smart traffic lights, smart traffic screens, and reversible lanes.

Globalization 
August to September 2015: invested in Grab, Lyft, and Ola.

August 2016: acquired Uber China and obtained an equity interest in Uber.

January 2017: made a strategic investment in 99(app), Brazil's largest local shared mobility provider. In its official announcement, DiDi noted its intention to provide strategic guidance and support to 99 in the areas of technology, product development, operations and business planning.

March 2017: opened a research and development center called DiDi Labs in Mountain View, California, U.S.

July 2017: co-led a new financing round of Grab.

August 2017: formed a strategic partnership with Taxify, a transportation network company operating in Europe and Africa. DiDi also formed a strategic partnership with Careem, a transportation network company operating in the Middle East and North Africa.

January 2018: acquired 99 and now operates in Brazil under the 99 brand.

February 2018: launched its new app in Hong Kong, which is an upgraded version of Kuaidi Taxi. It was also announced that DiDi will, along with SoftBank Group, begin a venture in Japan.

April 2018: started operation under its main name in Mexico.

May 2018: started trial operation in Geelong, Australia.

July 2018: DiDi and Tokyo-based SoftBank Corp. have set up a joint venture for taxi-hailing in Japan.

September 2018: launched a taxi-hailing service in Osaka.

November 2018: launched a research facility in Toronto, its second in North America.

March 2019: launched ride-hailing services in Newcastle, Australia.

April 2019: launched Taxi-Hailing Service in Tokyo and Kyoto.

June 2019: started operations under its main name in Chile and Colombia.

November 2019: DiDi scheduled to commence ride sharing services in Perth, Western Australia. DiDi will be the third major player to enter the West Australian ride share market alongside Uber and Ola. DiDi also launched operations in Costa Rica this month.

January 2020: DiDi started hiring staff to start its business in Russia.

August 2020: DiDi launched service in Kazan, Russia.

November 2020: Announced entry into New Zealand market.

November 2020: DiDi launched services in the Dominican Republic.

May 2021: DiDi launched services in other Russian cities (Ufa, Tomsk, Voronezh, Tyumen, Krasnodar and other).

March 2021: Announced launch in South Africa after a pilot in Gqeberha.

May 2021: DiDi launched services in Kazakhstan, its fourth country in the Eurasian market.

September 2021: DiDi launched services in Egypt, its second country on the African continent.

March 2022: DiDi suspended services in Kazakhstan, citing "market changes and other challenges".

April 2022: DiDi suspended services in South Africa, which it launched in March of the previous year.

Leadership 
Cheng Wei, founder and CEO of Didi Chuxing

Cheng Wei founded Beijing Orange Technology Co Ltd. in 2012, and soon launched Didi Dache, a taxi-hailing app. Prior to founding Beijing Orange, Cheng Wei worked in Alibaba Group for eight years. Cheng Wei holds a BA from Beijing University of Chemical Technology.

Jean Liu, president of Didi Chuxing

Jean joined in DiDi in July 2014 from her previous position as managing director in Goldman Sachs Asia for 12 years. Jean is a member of the board of directors of ONE Foundation. Jean earned her B.A. from Peking University and her M.S. from Harvard University, both in Computer Science. Jean received an honorary Doctor of Commercial Science from New York University.

Staff 
Employment: DiDi claims that it provides over tens of millions of flexible job opportunities for people, including a considerable number of women, laid-off workers and veteran soldiers. Based on a survey released by DiDi in March 2019, women rideshare drivers in Brazil, China and Mexico account for 16.7%, 7.4% and 5.6% of total rideshare drivers on its platforms, respectively. DiDi supports more than 4,000 innovative SMEs, which provides more than 20,000 jobs additionally.

Diversity: 40% of DiDi's employees are women. In 2017, DiDi launched a female career development plan and established the "DiDi Women's Network". It is reportedly the first female-oriented career development plan in a major Chinese Internet company.

Honors 
 2015: DiDi was announced as a World Economic Forum Global Growth Company
2016: DiDi was included in Fortune "Change the World" list
2016: DiDi was named one of the World's 50 Smartest Companies by MIT Technology Review
2017: DiDi was nominated as one of the best five startups for TechCrunch's 10th Annual Crunchies Awards
2018: DiDi was included in Fast Company "Top 10 Most innovative Companies in China" list
2018: DiDi was included in the Global Clean Tech 100 list by Cleantech Group
2018: DiDi was named on CNBC's Disruptor 50 list
2018: DiDi was selected on Fortune's Change The World list
2018: DiDi Rider App was recognized as Best Hidden Gem for Mexico in Google Play's Best of 2018 list
2021: DiDi was named one of the 100 Most Influential Companies by Time.

References

External Links
 

Companies based in Beijing
Companies traded over-the-counter in the United States
Transport companies established in 2015
Transport software
Chinese brands
Chinese companies established in 2015
Carsharing
Vehicles for hire
Apple Inc. partnerships
Ridesharing companies of China
Road transport in China
Online companies of China
Transport companies of China
2021 initial public offerings